Brianna Moyes (born 17 March 1991 ) is an Australian rules footballer and basketball who played for the Fremantle Football Club in the AFL Women's (AFLW) and South Mandurah in the Peel Football League Women's competition. Originally from Sydney, she has previously played basketball for Perth Lynx, Gold Coast Rollers and two US colleges, University of Akron and Colorado Christian University.

In the first quarter of her debut match against Collingwood at Fremantle Oval in Round 3 of the 2019 AFLW season, Moyes ruptured her anterior cruciate ligament in her knee, causing her to be out for the remainder of the season.

References

External links 

1991 births
Living people
Fremantle Football Club (AFLW) players
Perth Lynx players
Australian rules footballers from New South Wales
Australian women's basketball players
Guards (basketball)